Dušan Vidojević (born 6 April 1979) is a retired footballer who played as a midfielder.

Club career
Born in Belgrade, Vidojević began playing football with FK Rad in the First League of Serbia and Montenegro.

Vidojević moved to Greece in July 2002, joining Greek first division side PAS Giannina F.C., making 21 top flight league appearances for the club. He would also play for Kerkyra F.C. and Panachaiki F.C. in the Greek second division. He also had a brief spell with FC Brașov in the Romanian second division.

He returned to Serbia and played for FK Voždovac and FK Banat Zrenjanin in the Serbian Superliga.

References

External links
Profile at Srbijafudbal
Profile at Jelen Football

1979 births
Living people
Footballers from Belgrade
Serbian footballers
FK Rad players
FK Jedinstvo Ub players
FK Voždovac players
FK Banat Zrenjanin players
FK Sloga Kraljevo players
PAS Giannina F.C. players
A.O. Kerkyra players
Panachaiki F.C. players
FC Brașov (1936) players
Association football midfielders
Serbian expatriate footballers
Expatriate footballers in Greece
Serbian expatriate sportspeople in Greece
Super League Greece players
Expatriate footballers in Romania
Serbian expatriate sportspeople in Romania